Rhizochromulinales is an order of Dictyochophyceae. The order includes the genus, Rhizochromulina.

Ciliophrys is also sometimes included in this group.

References

Dictyochophyceae
Heterokont orders